{|
{{Infobox ship image
|Ship image=Suffren-IMG 8647.jpg
|Ship caption=1/20th scale model of Suffren, lead ship of Massénas class, on display at the Musée national de la Marine
}}

|}Masséna''' was ordered as a third-rank, 90-gun sailing  for the French Navy, but was converted to a steam-powered ship in the 1850s while under construction. Completed in 1861 the ship participated in the Second French intervention in Mexico the following year. Hulked in 1879 and used as a barracks ship, the vessel sank at her moorings in 1904 and was subsequently scrapped in place.

Description
The Suffren-class ships were enlarged versions of the 80-gun  ships of the line that had been designed by naval architect Jacques-Noël Sané. The conversion to steam power involved cutting Massénas frame in half amidships and building a new section to house the propulsion machinery and coal bunkers. Her crew numbered 913 officers and ratings. Details are lacking on her propulsion machinery, the only information available is that her two steam engines were rated at 800 nominal horsepower and produced  which gave her a speed of  during her sea trials.

The ship's armament consisted of eighteen 30-pounder smoothbore cannon and sixteen  rifled muzzle-loading (MLR) guns on the lower gundeck and thirty-four 30-pounder cannon on the upper gundeck. On the quarterdeck and forecastle were twenty 163 mm Paixhans guns and a pair of 163 mm MLR guns.

Construction and career
Laid down as Spectre in September 1835 at the Arsenal de Rochefort, the ship was renamed Masséna on 2 April 1850. She was ordered to be converted to steam power on 19 October 1854. The conversion began on 12 March 1856 and the ship was launched on 15 March 1860. Masséna'' was commissioned on 21 April 1860 although her sea trials did not begin until November 1861. The ship ferried troops to Mexico in 1861–1862. She was used as a transport from 1867, and stricken on 9 May 1879. From 1880, she was used as barracks in Toulon, and she was eventually broken up in 1906.

Citations

References

Ships of the line of the French Navy
Ships built in France
1860 ships
Suffren-class ships of the line